Ptelea (hoptree) is a genus of shrubs and trees in the family Rutaceae.

Ptelea may also refer to:
 Ptelea (Attica), a deme of ancient Attica, Greece
 Ptelea, Evros, Greece
 Ptelea, Kozani, Greece